The 2010 Vietnamese Cup was the 18th edition of the Vietnamese Cup. It started on 23 January 2010 and finished on 28 August 2010.

The cup winner were guaranteed a place in the 2011 AFC Cup.

First round

Byes: Đà Nẵng, Bình Dương, Sông Lam Nghệ An, Hải Phòng, Thanh Hóa, Đồng Tháp

Second round

Quarterfinals

Semi-finals

Final

References
RSSSF.com

Vietnamese National Cup
Cup